The 4th Tenor is a 2002 American comedy film directed by Harry Basil and written by and starring Rodney Dangerfield. It was Dangerfield's final film role during his lifetime before his death in October 2004.

Premise
Lupo falls in love with an Italian woman who rejects him, insisting that she will only marry a great opera singer. Lupo travels to Italy in hopes of learning how to sing opera.

Cast
Rodney Dangerfield as Lupo
Anita De Simone as Rosa
Annabelle Gurwitch as Gina
Charles Fleischer as Alphonse
Robert Davi as Ierra
Hamilton Camp as Papa
Elsa Raven as Mama
Jacob Urrutia as Mario
Richard Libertini as Vincenzo
Dom Irrera as Petey
Patrick Cupo as Nunzio
Anney Giobbe as Francesca
Vincent Schiavelli as Marcello 
Pierrino Mascarino as Roberto
Marty Belafsky as Johnny
Don Stark as Tony 
Lisa Mende as Sonia

References

External links
 

2002 films
2002 comedy films
American comedy films
Films with screenplays by Rodney Dangerfield
2002 directorial debut films
Films directed by Harry Basil
2000s English-language films
2000s American films
English-language comedy films